Prince Yeongyang (Hangul: 영양군, Hanja: 永陽君; 29 May 1521 – 6 September 1561), personal name Yi Geo was a Royal Prince of the Joseon dynasty as the 4th son of Yi Yeok, King Jungjong, from Royal Noble Consort Chang. He was the paternal uncle of the 14th monarch, Yi Yeon, King Seonjo. He was said to be gentle and humble. He was the founder of "Cadet branch of Prince Yeongyang of the Jeonju Yi clan" (전주이씨 영양군파).

According to Veritable Records of the Joseon Dynasty, it was recorded that he and his half older-sister, Princess Uihye decorated their private manor (close with Princess Hyojeong's manor) in a lavish manner and got criticized for it.

Life

Ancestors

Marriage and life
He later married the daughter of An Se-hyeong (안세형) who served as the Left Chanseong of Joseon State Council (의정부 좌찬성, 議政府 左贊成), Princess Consort Gyeongyang of the Sunheung An clan (경양군부인 순흥 안씨). However, since they two had no any issue, so they adopted Yi Su-jeon (이수전), a Heungnyeong Deputy Chief (흥녕부정, 興寧副正). Su-jeon was the biological son of Yi Seok-su (이석수) and the grandson of Yi Jong, Prince Musan (이종 무산군), who was the 12nd son of Seongjong of Joseon. As Su-jeon become Geo's son, he then become "Prince Heungnyeong" (흥녕군). Meanwhile, Yeongyang later died on 6 September 1561 at 40 years old and received his royal titles.

Tomb
His tomb was firstly located at Dongjak-ri, Gwacheon-si, Gyeonggi-do (nowadays is Dongjak-ri, Dongjak-gu, Seoul-si), right from his mother, but was moved to Injwawon (인좌원, 寅坐原), Hurok Village, Sasi-ri, Jangdo-myeon, Jangdan-gun, Gyeonggi-do on 26 February 1581 along with his wife, then his tombstone was erected in 1941 after the Korean Empire and South Korea was established.

His inscription was written by two different peoples, first, by Min Gyeong-sik (민경식, 閔景植) whom graduated in Hongmungwan University (홍문관대제학) and became the 2nd rank military officer of Hanseong-bu (한성부판윤, 漢城府判尹) and secondly, by Yi Beom-seok (이범석, 李範錫) who was graduated in Hongmungwan University too.

References

영양군파 약사 - 전주이씨대동종약원 .

1521 births
1561 deaths
16th-century Korean people
House of Yi
Jeonju Yi clan
Korean princes